Sing Street is a musical with music and lyrics by Gary Clark and John Carney and a book by Enda Walsh. The musical is based on Carney's 2016 film of the same name. The stage adaptation was originally presented at New York Theatre Workshop. Directed by Rebecca Taichman and produced by Barbara Broccoli, Brian Carmody, Patrick Milling-Smith, Michael Wilson, Orin Wolf, and Frederick Zollo, the musical was initially set to premiere on Broadway at the Lyceum Theatre in previews on March 26, 2020 and officially on April 19 but was ultimately delayed due to the COVID-19 pandemic. Nevertheless, a cast recording featuring the original Broadway cast was released on April 22, 2020. The show was presented by the Huntington Theatre Company in Boston in the fall of 2022, with plans to move to Broadway.

Overview
The musical takes place in 1982, in Dublin, Republic of Ireland.

Productions

Off-Broadway (2019) 
Sing Street, like Carney's film Once, was adapted for the stage as a musical, also called Sing Street. The screenplay was adapted by Enda Walsh (who also wrote the book for the musical Once) and the production was directed by Rebecca Taichman. The show opened at New York Theatre Workshop on December 16, 2019 after extensive workshops and three weeks of preview performances. The production closed on January 26, 2020.

Boston (2022) 
A second production ran at Boston's Calderwood Pavilion, presented by The Huntington Theatre in association with Sing Street Broadway LLC.  The run, which began on August 26 and concluded on October 9, 2022, once again has direction by Rebecca Taichman, choreography by Sonya Tayeh, and set design by Bob Crowley. Costume design was by Crowley and Lisa Zinni, lighting design was by Natasha Katz, sound design was by Peter Hylenski, video design were by Luke Halls and Brad Peterson, Wigs/Hair and Makeup are by Tommy Kurzman.

Characters and original cast

Musical numbers
New York Theatre Workshop 
 "Just Can't Get Enough" – Conor
 "Riddle of the Model" – Conor
 "Up" – Conor
 "A Beautiful Sea" – Conor & Raphina
 "Girls" – Conor & Anne
 "Faith of Our Fathers" – Brother Baxter
 "Dream for You" – Conor
 "Drive It Like You Stole It" – Conor
 "Up (Down Version)" – Conor
 "Brown Shoes" – Conor & Barry
 "To Find You" – Conor
 "Go Now" – Brendan
Boston
 "Riddle of the Model" – Conor
 "Up" – Conor
 "Up (Reprise)" – Raphina
 "Go On" – Lawlor Family
 "A Beautiful Sea" – Conor & Raphina
 "Girls" – Lawlor Siblings 
 "To Find You" – Conor
 "Drive It Like You Stole It" – Conor
 "Up (Down Version)" – Conor
 "Faith of Our Fathers" – Brother Baxter
 "Brown Shoes" – Conor, Eamon, Barry
 "To Find You (Reprise)" – Raphina & Conor
 "Go Now" – Brendan & Company

All songs are taken from the original film, except "Just Can't Get Enough", "Faith of Our Fathers", and "Dream for You".

Awards and nominations

Original Off-Broadway production

References 

2019 musicals
Off-Broadway musicals
Broadway musicals
Musicals based on films
Irish musicals
Plays set in Ireland
Rock musicals
Works impacted by the COVID-19 pandemic